is a role-playing video game developed by Media.Vision and published by Bandai Namco Entertainment for PlayStation 4 and PlayStation Vita. It is the follow-up to 2015's Digimon Story: Cyber Sleuth, part of the Digimon Story series, and based on the larger Digimon franchise. The game shares elements and locations from its predecessor, while featuring a new story set during its events.

The game was released in Japan in December 14, 2017, and worldwide on January 19, 2018. A port of the game and its predecessor, Digimon Story Cyber Sleuth: Complete Edition, was released on October 18, 2019 for Nintendo Switch and Windows.

Gameplay 
Digimon Story: Cyber Sleuth – Hacker's Memory is a role-playing game, played from a third-person perspective where the player takes control of Keisuke Amasawa, a Digimon tamer who can command up to three of his companions in battle against other Digimon. The player can choose between either Gotsumon, Betamon, or Tentomon as their partner at the start of the game, with more obtainable as the story is progressed.

It features 341 creatures in total, including all those present in the original version of Digimon Story: Cyber Sleuth, plus an additional 92. It also contains many of the original areas and maps found in its predecessor along with new additions.

Plot 

Hacker's Memory takes place in the same world and timeline as the original Digimon Story: Cyber Sleuth: a near-future version of Shibuya, Japan where an advanced form of the internet known as Cyberspace Eden which users can physically enter. The story revolves around a boy named , whose Eden Account is stolen in a phishing attack. After the identity theft leaves him accused of a crime he didn't commit, he joins a group of hackers called "Hudie" and delves into the depths of Eden to find the real culprit. Along the way, he befriends a number of Digimon, digital lifeforms who inhabit the information world. Characters from the original Cyber Sleuth, such as Fei and her partner TigerVespamon from the hacker group Zaxon, also appear; this shows a previously unseen side of their story from the previous title.

Keisuke Amasawa was accused of a crime he didn't commit, which lead to him dropping out of school. The only person left trusting him being his childhood friend, Yu Nogi. Keisuke's Eden account had also been stolen, so Keisuke goes on a journey to find out who stole his account. Using information provided by a mysterious hacker known as K, he attempts to track down his missing account. He finds himself at a place known as the Digi-Market, in which he starts to ask around and not wanting to seem out of place, attempts to buy a Digimon, however he barely has any money, meaning he can only buy one of the worst Digimon they have, which were going to be deleted anyway - one of Gotsumon, Tentomon or Betamon. Keisuke chooses one to buy, though before he does, he demands the salesman let the other two go instead of deleting them. The salesman becomes angry at Keisuke for demanding such a thing, so summons his Ogremon and Devimon to attack Keisuke. Ryuji Mishima and Cyberdramon appear to defend Keisuke and the chosen Digimon runs in to try and help defend Keisuke too. Seeing this, Ryuji adds the Digimon capture program to Keisuke's Digivice which allows Keisuke to capture the Digimon. They then team up and defeat the salesman, then force him to release the other two Digimon back into the wild. Ryuji then offers Keisuke a job as a member of Hudie, which Keisuke accepts, making him teammates with Ryuji, Chitose Imai and Erika Mishima. Hudie works directly under Yuugo Kamashiro's Zaxon, doing various missions for the group, usually being assigned them by second in command, Fei Wong Tomoe Ignacio. Hudie also directly get involved, sometimes helping and sometimes unintentionally making things worse for them, with the various missions of Aiba and their friends, Nokia Shiramine, Arata Sanada, Kyoko Kuremi, Yuuko Kamishiro, Makiko Date, Gorou Matayoshi and Mirei Mikagura as well as Aiba's enemies, Jimmy KEN, Akemi Suedou and Rie Kishibe - Keisuke however, is on friendly terms with Jimmy Ken and Suedou and considers them friends. Keisuke also finds himself involved with the Royal Knights and Seven Deadly Demons, though unlike Aiba who becomes acquainted with every single member of both group, Keisuke only befriends Omnimon, Alphamon, Veevee, Craniamon and Beelzemon, whilst Crusadermon is a direct enemy to both Keisuke and Aiba. Despite befriending all of Aiba friends, Keisuke himself never meets Aiba.

Following the leads of K, Keisuke deals with various hackers and eventually finds out that K himself was responsible for stealing Keisuke's account and had been using it the entire time. Keisuke later learns that K was actually his best friend, Yu, who was madly in love with Keisuke and was being manipulated into doing evil things to get Keisuke's attention by a Matadormon posing as a mask. Keisuke defeats the Matadormon, freeing Yu from its clutches, though Yu, embarrassed by everything he's done ignores Keisuke.

Similar to Aiba and their friends, Hudie also had to deal with the Eaters. In Under Zero, Crusadermon summons a giant group of them, which attack countless numbers of hackers, causing them to acquire EDEN Syndrome. Ryuji is seconds away from being attacked, being pushed out of the way at the last second by his best friend, Chitose. This shocks the leader of Hudie, who goes into a deep depression from seeing his best friend sacrifice himself for him. This dark depression winds up attracting the attention of Arcadiamon, who teams up with Ryuji in his mission to murder all hackers as revenge for Chitose's sacrifice. Ryuji would kill the hackers, whilst Arcaidamon would kill their Digimon. Digivolving all the way up to the Mega level, whilst absorbing multiple Digimon and humans, Ryuji and Arcadiamon cause massive trouble all over Eden and the real world. Whilst doing so, Erika tasks Keisuke to track down an Eater. After defeating it, they hack it and use its data to reach the Eaters home world, where they come across the real Yuugo Kamishiro. Explaining that they had come to locate Chitose's memory data, Yuugo allows them to do so, which they find due to the help of Chitose's Ankylomon. They restore Chitose's mental data, causing him to be the only person to awaken from Eden Syndrome. Keisuke attempts to inform Ryuji, only for Ryuji not to believe him, leading to Keisuke defeating Arcadiamon. Chitose then arrives and yells at Ryuji for his actions, the shock of Chitose actually being back alive shocking Ryuji out of his depression. However, Arcaidamon has woken back up and attempts to murder Chitose. Like Chitose had done before, Ryuji pushes Chitose out of the way and takes the attack instead, before flying off to Odaiba. Keisuke and Erika locate Arcadiamon, who was now in its Ultra stage. They are unable to harm it, leading Erika to have her Eater Bits, which she had created using the previous hacked Eater data, attack it which slows it down enough to harm it. Keisuke then kills Arcadiamon, freeing Ryuji and Cyberdramon. Erika however had overexerted herself and passes out, which leads to her Eater Bits attacking her and merging with her to become Eater Legion.

Eater Legion attempts to get to the Digital World, as do the massive amount of Eaters, which causes EDEN to shut down. Needing to get into Eden to free Erika, Fei allows Hudie to use Yuuko's personal EDEN computer, which with the help of Yu and the various hacker groups Keisuke had fought against, manage to gain access, though only enough power existed to allow Keisuke, Chitose and Ryuji to enter. Finding Eden to be infested with countless amount of Eaters, they fight their way through, eventually finding Eater Legion. They attempt to defeat it without killing the body, but this proves to be impossible and Erika instructs them to kill Eater Legion as her body was too assimilated with it. Erika's non corrupted memory data from her server merges with her Wormmon to become Hudiemon and she aids in killing her original body. A large group of Eaters then merge with the rest of her corrupted memory banks, creating Eater EDEN, which Hudie manage to kill as well. Due to the actions of Aiba in the Digital World, the world is reset and changed so that EDEN never existed, which in turn means that Digimon never arrived in the real world to interact with humans. Erika makes the choice to remain as Hudiemon, rather than return as Erika because should she return to a human world without EDEN, she will die due to EDEN being the only reason she was still alive. In addition, she was directly responsible for the death of her parents in a car crash, which is what caused her illness in the first place, so erasing herself out of existence will not only remove all burdens from her brother but will also cause her parents to stay alive. Keisuke leaves his Digimon with Erika, as do Chitose and Ryuji. Hudie return to the real world, with their memories of Digimon and Erika erased. With no Erika in the new world, Ryuji is an only child with his parents still alive. He still however, is the leader of Hudie - with Chitose and Keisuke working for him. Without the influence of Matadormon, Yu is also a member of Hudie and remains on good terms with Keisuke. Unlike the rest of the group however, Keisuke retains his memories. In one final cutscene, the group decides to go out to celebrate Ryuji getting a job. Before leaving, Keisuke goes to see Erika's bedroom, and discovers that it is now used for storage, and cries. However, on the way back to catch up with the group, a glowing blue butterfly flies past Keisuke's face and into the storage room. It then flies into a monitor, that turns on to reveal the Digimon the player used in the game, as well as Erika and Wormmon. The game's producer Kazumasa Habu confirmed the butterfly was Erika visiting her former friends, and that she had used her newfound powers as Hudiemon to create an alternate universe in which she lives happily with alternate versions of them.

Development 
Hacker's Memory was first announced in a March 2017 issue of Japanese V Jump magazine as the follow-up to the original Digimon Story: Cyber Sleuth, where it was released on December 14, 2017. The Japanese PlayStation 4 version is bundled with the previous Cyber Sleuth title, which was originally a Western-exclusive port. Bandai Namco described the game as an "other side" story that tells the events leading up to and including the previous entry from the perspective of a new character. It also re-uses many assets from its predecessor, including maps and Digimon, while adding many of its own. On December 28, the Japanese Digimon games account tweeted that if their tweet got more than 2018 retweets before January 5, four new Digimon would be added to the game as free DLC. The amount was achieved in a few hours. Famitsu later revealed the four Digimon would be Ouryumon and his evolution line. They later added a stretch goal of 10,000 retweets to add one more Digimon. The retweets reached 10,000 one day before the deadline. The first four DLC Digimon were added on January 24. The final DLC Digimon was revealed as Apocalymon with it being added at some point in February. Apocalymon was added on February 13. The Sistermon Noir/Blanc pre-order DLC was censored in North America, due to Noir being a nun and this not being suitable in North America, so Noir was changed from a black cat like nun Digimon, into a blue mouse like nun Digimon as Namco USA had forced the change. Every other region however was unaffected by the censorship and had access to Noir, rather than the censored Ciel.

An English version was released on January 19, 2018. As with the previous game, the game's soundtrack was composed and produced by Masafumi Takada, and with character designs by Suzuhito Yasuda.

The Nintendo Switch and PC versions were developed by h.a.n.d.

Reception 

Both the PlayStation Vita and PlayStation 4 versions of Hacker's Memory received a 35 out of 40 total score from Japanese magazine Weekly Famitsu based on individual scores of 9, 9, 9, and 8.

Hacker's Memory received average to mixed reviews upon its English release, earning a 73 out of 100 average from aggregate review website Metacritic.

Sales 
In Japan, Hacker's Memory suffered lower than expected sales. According to Media Create sales data, the Vita version sold 24,636 copies in its debut week, with the PlayStation 4 version selling 20,890 copies, becoming the ninth and tenth highest-selling software titles respectively for that period in the region. In the UK, Hacker's Memory was the tenth best selling game in the first week of its release. Hacker's Memory was the highest selling PS Vita game of 2018 in the US. By October 2020, Hacker's Memory and Cyber Sleuth had shipped more than 1.5 million units worldwide combined. The Switch port of Complete Edition sold  4,536 copies in its first week in Japan.

Notes

References

External links

2017 video games
Bandai Namco games
Censored video games
Digimon video games
Multiplayer and single-player video games
Nintendo Switch games
PlayStation 4 games
PlayStation 4 Pro enhanced games
PlayStation Vita games
Postcyberpunk
Role-playing video games
Video games developed in Japan
Video games scored by Masafumi Takada
Windows games
Video games set in Tokyo
H.a.n.d. games
Media.Vision games